Callicore excelsior, the superb numberwing or excelsior eighty-eight, is a species of butterfly of the family Nymphalidae. It is found in Colombia, Ecuador, Peru, Brazil, and Bolivia.

Adults are black on the upper surface of the wings, with a metallic deep blue sheen on the hindwings, and a broad arc of orange or red on the forewings.

Subspecies
C. e. excelsior (Brazil (Amazonas))
C. e. inferior (Butler, 1877) (Ecuador, Peru)
C. e. excelsissima (Staudinger, [1885]) (Brazil (Amazonas))
C. e. pastazza (Staudinger, 1886) (Peru)
C. e. michaeli (Staudinger, 1890) (Brazil (Amazonas, Mato Grosso))
C. e. splendida (Weymer, 1890) (Peru)
C. e. arirambae (Ducke, 1913) (Brazil (Pará, Amazonas))
C. e. elatior (Oberthür, 1916) (Ecuador)
C. e. ockendeni (Oberthür, 1916) (Peru)
C. e. micheneri (Dillon, 1948) (Colombia, Ecuador)
C. e. mauensis (Fassl, 1922) (Brazil (Amazonas))
C. e. marisolae Neukirchen, 1995 (Brazil (Amazonas))

References

Biblidinae
Lepidoptera of Brazil
Nymphalidae of South America
Butterflies described in 1858